Shawano Community High School is a public high school serving Shawano, Wisconsin, and the surrounding areas.

Athletics 
Shawano's athletic teams are known as the Hawks, and compete in the Bay Conference.

Enrollment 
From 2000 to 2019, high school enrollment declined 8.7%.

Enrollment at Shawano Community High School, 2000–2019

References

High schools in Wisconsin
Shawano County, Wisconsin